Pradeep Neogy (28 May 1949 – December 1993) was an Indian cricketer. He played one first-class match for Bengal in 1981/82.

See also
 List of Bengal cricketers

References

External links
 

1949 births
1993 deaths
Indian cricketers
Bengal cricketers
Cricketers from Pune